Scărișoara Cave, is one of the biggest ice caves in the Apuseni Mountains of Romania, in a part of Carpathian chain. It is considered a show cave and one of the natural wonders of Romania. It has also been described as a glacier cave.

History
First mentioned in 1863 by the Austrian geographer Arnold Schmidl, who made some observations and the first map of the cave, it was later explored by the Romanian scientist and speleologist Emil Racoviță between 1921 and 1923, who mentioned it and its origin in his 1927 work Speologia (Speleology). The ice cave was formed 3,500 years ago, during the glaciations, when these mountains were covered by snow and ice. The exact date when the cave was first discovered by humans is unknown.

Description

From the Great Hall, passages lead into several other named rooms: the Church, which features over 100 ice stalagmites, the Great Reservation, Coman Gallery to the left, and Little Reservation to the right. 

The temperature is up to +1 °C in the summer and down to -7 °C in the winter. In the part for tourists the average temperature is around 0 °C. Bats live in the ice cave, as do small bugs (2–3 mm long) called Pholeuon prozerpinae glaciale. In the Big Reservation a Rupicapra skeleton was discovered.

Access 
The portion of the cave open to tourists includes the entrance shaft, The Big Hall and The Church. Access to the other chambers is reserved for scientific research by the agreement of the Speological Institute of Cluj-Napoca.

See also
 List of caves
 Apuseni Natural Park 
 Seven Natural Wonders of Romania

References

External links
 Scarisoara Cave - Romanian Monasteries.org

Caves of Romania
Geography of Bihor County
Geography of Transylvania
Ice caves
Show caves
Western Romanian Carpathians
Tourist attractions in Romania
Tourist attractions in Bihor County